Vaalgras is a village in Namibia's ǁKaras Region. It is home to a community of the Oorlam people, a group descends from the OvaHerero, Nama and other groups.

Notable residents
 Emil Appolus
 Eric Biwa
 Willem Konjore (1945–2021), government minister

References

Populated places in the ǁKaras Region
Oorlam people